Thijs Stoffer of the Netherlands served as the chairman of the Kandersteg International Scout Centre Committee.

Background
In 2011, Stoffer was awarded the 331st Bronze Wolf, the only distinction of the World Organization of the Scout Movement, awarded by the World Scout Committee for exceptional services to world Scouting.

Stoffer lives in Kandersteg, Switzerland.

References

External links

Recipients of the Bronze Wolf Award
Scouting and Guiding in the Netherlands
Scouting and Guiding in Switzerland
Year of birth missing (living people)
Living people